Wonderful is the fourth studio album by American hardcore punk band Circle Jerks, released July 21, 1985 by Combat Records.

Track listing

Release and reception

In an AllMusic review, Alex Ogg says "The Circle Jerks were always a limited band that happened to cover the basics exceptionally well. However, Wonderful is the worst example of the treadmill approach to hard rock/punk that engulfed them in the mid-'80s. Greg Hetson and Keith Morris were trying out yet another rhythm section (Keith Clark and journeyman Zander Schloss), but the real fault lies in their gutless, inconclusive self-production and lackluster songwriting. Dodge this and opt for either their earlier or later work. The one saving grace is the cover artwork by Gary Leonard -- featuring your heroes resplendent in tuxedos and cheesy smiles.".

Personnel
Keith Morris - vocals
Greg Hetson - guitar
Zander Schloss - bass
Keith Clark - drums, piano on "Another Broken Heart for Snake"

Guest musicians
Jamie Sheriff - strings on "Another Broken Heart for Snake"

Productions
Karat Faye - producer, engineer
Jim McMahon - assistant engineer
Ken Perry - mastering
Mark Weinberg - design
Gary Leonard - artwork
Peter Oliver - photography

References

1985 albums
Circle Jerks albums
Combat Records albums